Gilbirds is an unincorporated community in Brown County, Illinois, United States. Gilbirds is located on Illinois Route 99, northwest of Versailles.

References

Unincorporated communities in Brown County, Illinois
Unincorporated communities in Illinois